Vrhovlje pri Kojskem is a settlement north of Kojsko in the Municipality of Brda in the Littoral region of Slovenia.

Name
The name of the settlement was changed from Vrhovlje to Vrhovlje pri Kojskem in 1953. The settlement is also known as Vrhuje in the local dialect and humorously as Slepo Vrhovlje (literally, 'blind Vrhovlje'), in contrast to nearby Vrhovlje pri Kožbani (dubbed Gluho Vrhovlje 'deaf Vrhovlje').

Church
The local church is dedicated to Mary Help of Christians and belongs to the Parish of Šmartno.

Notable people
Notable people that were born or lived in Vrhovlje pri Kojskem include:
 Ivan Kovačič (1873–1936), writer and folk poet

References

External links
 Vrhovlje pri Kojskem on Geopedia

Populated places in the Municipality of Brda